Karlo Bauman (2 February 1914 – 6 July 1954) was a Croatian sailor. He competed at the 1936 Summer Olympics and the 1952 Summer Olympics.

References

External links
 

1914 births
1954 deaths
Croatian male sailors (sport)
Olympic sailors of Yugoslavia
Sailors at the 1936 Summer Olympics – O-Jolle
Sailors at the 1952 Summer Olympics – Finn